Haptoglobin-related protein is a protein that in humans is encoded by the HPR gene. The HPR gene affects hereditary immunity to a non-pathogenic species of African trypanosomes.

See also
 Haptoglobin
 Trypanosoma brucei: Killing by human serum and resistance to human serum killing

References

Further reading

African trypanosomiasis